The bibliography of Russian history consists of the following sections:

 Bibliography of the history of the Early Slavs and Rus'
 Bibliography of Russian history (1223–1613)
 Bibliography of Russian history (1613–1917)
 Bibliography of the Russo-Japanese War
 Bibliography of Russia during World War I
 Bibliography of the Russian Revolution and Civil War
 Bibliography of Stalinism and the Soviet Union
 Bibliography of the Soviet Union during World War II
 Bibliography of the Post Stalinist Soviet Union
 Bibliography of Russian history (1991–present)

See also
 Bibliography of the history of Central Asia
 Bibliography of the history of the Caucasus
 Bibliography of Ukrainian history
 Bibliography of the history of Belarus and Byelorussia
 Bibliography of the history of Poland
 List of Slavic studies journals

Russian history
Russian
History